Somerset County Cricket Club competed in four domestic competitions during the 2009 English cricket season: the first division of the County Championship, the Friends Provident Trophy, the first division of the NatWest Pro40 League and the Twenty20 Cup. Through their performance in the Twenty20 Cup, the team qualified for the Champions League Twenty20. They enjoyed a successful season, but fell short of winning any competitions, prompting Director of Cricket Brian Rose to say "We've had enough of being cricket's nearly men."

Consistent performances in the County Championship helped Somerset remain challengers for the competition until the last few weeks of the season, but the batting-friendly pitch at their home ground, the County Ground, Taunton, meant that the county finished with too many draws to claim their first Championship title. Consistency was also key for Somerset's success in one-day cricket, where they remained unbeaten in the group stage of the Friends Provident Trophy, but were eliminated in the first knock-out round, and finished runners-up by one point in the NatWest Pro40. In the Twenty20 Cup, Somerset finished as losing finalists. This meant that they qualified for the Champions League Twenty20, where they progressed into the second group stage of the competition. They failed to win any matches in that phase of the competition, resulting in their elimination.

Somerset were captained for the third successive season by their Australian overseas player, Justin Langer, who announced during the season that it would be his last with Somerset. Marcus Trescothick topped the national batting tables, scoring almost 3,000 runs in all competitions in 2009; as a result, he was named as both Professional Cricketers' Association (PCA) Player of the Year and the PCA's Most Valuable Player of the Year.

Background

After promotion from the second division of the County Championship in 2007, Somerset were among the first division title contenders in the 2008. A loss to Lancashire in the final match of the season meant they finished in fourth place. David Foot, writing in Wisden, claimed that too many of the Somerset batsmen had "lost their way" in one-day cricket, as they narrowly avoided relegation in the NatWest Pro40, and were eliminated in the Friends Provident Trophy.

Somerset promoted four players from their academy for the 2009 season, giving contracts to Jos Buttler, Adam Dibble, Chris Jones and James Burke. Of these, only Buttler appeared in the first-team during the season. They also signed David Stiff, a fast bowler capped at Under-19 level for England, on a two-month contract at the beginning of the season, which was later extended to the end of the season. Ian Blackwell, captain of the side in 2005 and 2006, left for Durham after coach Andy Hurry and captain Justin Langer made it clear that they regarded fitness as a priority. John Francis and Keith Parsons both retired at the end of 2008, Francis cited lack of first-team opportunities for his departure, while at the age of 35, Parsons declared that: "There comes a time when your body tells you it's time to pack in professional sport."

In his preview of the 2009 season for ESPNcricinfo, Andrew McGlashan identified Somerset's opening partnerships with bat and ball as their main strengths, but predicted that the middle order would struggle to make an impact in the County Championship, stating that "none [of the middle order] jump out as potential match-winners in four-day cricket." He speculated that the team's best chance of success would come in the one-day competitions. The Daily Telegraph provided a more positive outlook, claiming that the county had "enough depth in batting and seam bowling to challenge [for the County Championship] again." They identified spin bowling as an area of weakness following the departure of Blackwell. Bob Willis, writing in The Guardian, shared this view, and predicted that Somerset would also be hindered by the difficulty of getting 20 wickets at home, resulting in too many draws.

Squad
The following players made at least one appearance for Somerset in first-class, List A or Twenty20 cricket in 2009. Age given is at the start of Somerset's first match of the season (15 April 2009).

County Championship

Although Marcus Trescothick had a season which David Foot described as "imperiously assured", Somerset failed to win enough matches to pose a real challenge in the 2009 County Championship. The flat pitch at the County Ground, Taunton did not help their efforts; the imbalance in favour of the batsmen meant that all but one match at the ground was drawn. Sussexs total of 742/5 declared was the fifteenth highest total in the history of the County Championship, while Murray Goodwins innings of 344 not out in that match was the sixth highest score by a batsman in the history of the competition. In total, six of Somerset's eight home matches contained scores of 500 or over in a single innings. In contrast, 500 was reached in only one of their away matches, by Hampshire at The Rose Bowl. The home conditions helped three of Somerset's batsmen pass 1,000 first-class runs in the season, including Craig Kieswetter and Arul Suppiah, who were both awarded their county caps after passing the landmark. Trescothick's 1,817 runs were the most by any batsman in the 2009 competition, finishing over 200 runs ahead of the next most prolific batsman, and he was named as both PCA Player of the Year and the PCA's Most Valuable Player of the Year for 2009. He was also selected as part of the team of the year, along with wicket-keeper Kieswetter.

In contrast to the strong batting line-up, Foot suggested that Somerset "lacked a seam bowler to compensate for Andrew Caddicks withdrawal". Caddick—who made his first-class debut for Somerset in 1991—only played five matches in 2009, and announced his intention to retire at the end of the season. He took ten wickets in 2009, and finished his career as Somerset's sixth highest wicket-taker of all-time. This placed the majority of the wicket-taking burden upon Charl Willoughby, the South African fast-medium pace bowler. He responded well, and took 54 wickets in the County Championship, more than any other bowler in the first division. He was aided by seam bowlers David Stiff, who returned to the first-class game for the first time since 2006, and Alfonso Thomas. Stiff took 31 wickets, more than quadrupling his career first-class wicket total, and Thomas took 35, his highest return in an English domestic season. Somerset lacked an effective spin bowler in 2009 following the departure of Ian Blackwell the previous season, and the spinners combined only claimed 31 wickets, bowling less balls between them than Willoughby alone.

Somerset began their season by playing out a high-scoring draw at home against Warwickshire, in which both teams reached 500 in their first innings. James Hildreth scored a triple-century, reaching the milestone earlier in an English season than any player previously, and became the first English player to pass 300 runs in an innings for Somerset since Harold Gimblett in 1948. In contrast, Somerset had to battle back for a draw in their second match. After Durham scored 543 in their first innings, Somerset collapsed to 69 all out in reply; only Langer passed 20 runs, while six of his batting colleagues made ducks. After being forced to follow-on, Trescothick, Langer and Kieswetter all scored centuries to secure a draw. Somerset's third match resulted in their only loss of the County Championship season, coming against Nottinghamshire at Trent Bridge; and at the end of May, they were second bottom in the first division. Their next match finished in a draw against Lancashire, a result which was always likely after the first day was lost to rain. Somerset next picked up victories against Yorkshire and Sussex before scoring the second-highest ever fourth innings winning total in the County Championship to beat Yorkshire at Taunton. These three wins propelled Somerset to third in the competition at the start of July, and they did not drop below this position for the remainder of the season.

In each of their following two matches, at home against Hampshire and away to Worcestershire, Somerset batted first and then enforced the follow-on after bowling their opponents out cheaply. In each their opponents managed to avoid defeat, and both matches resulted in draws. During the Worcestershire match, Langer's first innings 107 took him past Sir Donald Bradman's total of 28,067 first-class runs to become the highest-scoring Australian batsman. Successive draws against Nottinghamshire, Warwickshire, Sussex and Hampshire meant that Somerset travelled to Durham requiring a victory to maintain any realistic hopes of claiming the County Championship title. No play was possible on the third and fourth days, and the match resulted in another draw, leaving Somerset with only a slim mathematical chance of the title. Another draw, against Lancashire, while Durham beat Nottinghamshire, meant that Durham clinched the title. Somerset drew with Worcestershire (their ninth draw in a row in the competition), and finished third in the first division.

Season standings
Key: Pld = Played, W = Wins, L = Losses, D = Draws, T = Ties, A = Abandonments, Bat = Batting points, Bwl = Bowling points, Adj = Adjustments/Penalties, Pts = Points.

Adjustments:
Hampshire deducted 3 points for a slow over-rate in their match against Worcestershire.
Durham deducted 1 point for a slow over-rate in their match against Sussex.
Somerset deducted 1 point for a slow over-rate in their match against Durham.
Sussex deducted 1 point for a slow over-rate in their match against Worcestershire.
Notes:
Team marked  won the County Championship.
Teams marked  were relegated to Division Two of the County Championship.

Match log and statistics

Friends Provident Trophy

In the 2009 Friends Provident Trophy, the first one-day competition in the English domestic calendar, Somerset showed a marked improvement from the previous season. They were described by Steve James, writing in Wisden, as "the most impressive qualifiers" from the group stage, and both Trescothick and Kieswetter were praised for their batting form. They were the only side in the competition to remain unbeaten in the group stages, finishing with seven victories and one no result. In the quarter-final, against Group C runners-up Sussex, Somerset won the toss and opted to bat at Taunton. They struggled initially, losing the early wickets of Trescothick, James Hildreth and Ben Phillips for just 39 runs. A fourth-wicket partnership of 167, dominated by powerful hitting from Kieswetter in which he scored a "superb century" according to ESPNcricinfo's Andrew McGlashan, helped Somerset to recover to make 285/8, but Sussex chased the total down in the final over to eliminate the home side.

During the group stages of their campaign, Somerset achieved a number of large victories. They won by eight wickets against Warwickshire and Middlesex, and by more than a hundred runs against Kent and Scotland. Their match against Middlesex at Lord's was marred by some controversy, after Somerset were allowed too many powerplay overs in the rain-affected fixture. 
Somerset were set a reduced target of 290 off 41 overs, of which 19 were allocated by the umpires as being powerplay overs, three more than there should have been. The England and Wales Cricket Board (ECB) rejected Middlesex's request to replay the match, stating that they were upholding "the precedent that umpire errors cannot form the basis to declare a match null and void".

The two matches played against Middlesex were in stark contrast; in the match played at the Recreation Ground, Bath, Somerset bowled the London side out for 65, the joint second-lowest total made against Somerset in a List A match, while the 341/7 which Middlesex made at Lord's was the fourth-highest total scored against Somerset in the format. Somerset themselves scored their second-highest List A total, amassing 403/3 against Scotland, a game in which Hildreth scored 151, his highest List A score, and Somerset's highest score by a batsman at number three in List A cricket.

Zander de Bruyn finished the competition with the highest batting average amongst batsmen who played five or more innings. Four Somerset batsmen scored over 300 runs in the tournament (Trescothick, 476; Kieswetter, 395; de Bruyn, 388; Hildreth, 313), more than any other county except eventual winners Hampshire. Amongst the bowlers, Alfonso Thomas finished as the tournament's joint leading wicket-taker, claiming 20 wickets to finish level with Chris Schofield and Dominic Cork. Peter Tregos 18 wickets were the next most in the competition.

Season standings
Key: Pld = Played, W = Wins, T = Ties, L = Losses, NR = No result, Pts = Points, NRR = Net run rate.

Notes:
Teams marked  progressed to the next stage of the competition.
Teams marked  were eliminated from the competition.

Match logs and statistics

Twenty20 Cup

Somerset finished as runners-up to Sussex in the 2009 Twenty20 Cup, having reached Finals Day in what captain Justin Langer described as "bizarre" fashion. Somerset qualified for the knock-out stages of the competition as the best third-placed team during the group stage, then beat Lancashire in a bowl-out to qualify for the semi-finals. After overcoming Kent in the semi-final, Somerset were comprehensively beaten by Sussex in the final.

After the Indian Premier League's second season demonstrated the importance of spin bowling in Twenty20 cricket, and due to Somerset's lack of a front-line spin bowler, Somerset picked young leg spinner Max Waller to make his Twenty20 debut in their opening match of the campaign. He claimed three wickets in two overs to help Somerset win by one run, and finished the competition as Somerset's joint second-highest wicket-taker with 10 wickets. Despite a number of good performances by Somerset's bowlers, a batsman was named man of the match in each of the team's victories: James Hildreth, Craig Kieswetter and Marcus Trescothick were all awarded the accolade once, while Zander de Bruyn picked up the award on three occasions. Somerset completed the group stage with six wins, three losses and one no result, placing them third in the Midlands/Wales/West Division. They qualified for the knockout-stage as they were the best third-placed team in the three groups.

Somerset's quarter-final, against Lancashire, was scheduled for Tuesday 28 July 2009. Bad weather meant that no play was possible on either the Tuesday or Wednesday, as a result of which the teams requested special dispensation from the ECB for an additional reserve day on the Thursday, which was granted. The wet weather continued, forcing the teams to play a bowl-out. Each team had to select five bowlers, each of whom had two deliveries at a set of unguarded stumps. Somerset won the bowl-out 5–1, with Ben Phillips, Peter Trego and Willoughby each hitting the stumps once, and Thomas hitting them twice.

In the second semi-final of 2009 Finals Day, Somerset won the toss and elected to field against Kent. Economical bowling from Thomas and Willoughby, as well as the early wickets of Joe Denly and Martin van Jaarsveld, helped to limit Kent to 145/5. On a slow pitch, Trescothick played what ESPNcricinfo's Andrew McGlashan described as a "brutal innings", scoring 56 runs off 32 balls. He shared an opening partnership of 73 with captain Langer, and by the time of Trescothick's dismissal after 8.1 overs, Somerset required 62 runs off 71 balls. Hildreth and de Bruyn took 10 overs to add another 57 runs, and after Hildreth was bowled for 36, Kieswetter added two runs to grant Somerset victory with seven balls remaining. Against Sussex in the final, Somerset once again won the toss and elected to field. A strong batting display by Sussex, highlighted by Dwayne Smith's 59 runs off 26 balls, set Somerset a target of 173 to win. In the opening overs of Somerset's reply, Trescothick scored powerfully, making the chase "look simple" according to McGlashan. However, after he was caught on 33, Somerset lost regular wickets. A partnership of 41 between de Bruyn and Trego steadied Somerset for a time, but when the pair were dismissed in subsequent overs, their team collapsed from 104/4 to 109 all out.

At the start of the competition, Somerset played with aggressive batting tactics, opening the innings with Kieswetter and Trescothick for the first six matches. This opening pair only passed 20 runs together on one occasion, against Glamorgan, and for the rest of the tournament, Kieswetter dropped down the batting order and Langer joined Trescothick at the top of the innings, in a move that Kieswetter said "adds a bit of balance to the side by putting a bit more firepower down the end and experience up top". The more experienced pair passed 40 runs together on four out of five occasions. The county's bowling relied heavily on medium pace, a fact which cricket writer Scyld Berry suggested was exposed in the final.

Season standings
Key: Pld = Played, W = Wins, L = Losses, T = Ties, NR = No result, Pts = Points, NRR = Net run rate.

Notes:
Teams marked  progressed to the next stage of the competition.
Teams marked  were eliminated from the competition.

Match logs and statistics

NatWest Pro40
Somerset's first match of the 2009 NatWest Pro40, against Nottinghamshire, ended just one over short of the requirement for a match. Chasing 248 to win, Somerset were significantly behind the required rate when rain halted play in the ninth over. The side responded positively to this stroke of luck, winning their next three matches by significant margins, before losing to Essex. Having been put in to bat at Taunton, each of Somerset's top six batsman reached double figures, but none of them managed to pass 50 and the home side were eventually all out for 205. Despite taking early wickets during Essex's innings—at one stage having the visitors 12/3—the batting of John Maunders, James Foster and Tim Phillips propelled Essex past Somerset's total with five balls remaining. Two further victories ensured that Somerset entered their final match of the season with a chance to win the title.

Somerset had performed well but missed out narrowly in both the other one-day competitions in 2009, and could have clinched the competition with victory in their final match. News filtered through to the County Ground during their final match, against Durham, that leaders Sussex had lost to Worcestershire, meaning that a win against the north-eastern team would guarantee Somerset the title. The result rarely looked likely; a rapid opening to the chase by Durham openers Phil Mustard and Ian Blackwell provided a platform for their team to claim victory, and deny Somerset the title. Three of Somerset's bowlers claimed ten or more wickets in the competition (Ben Phillips, 14; Alfonso Thomas, 13; Charl Willoughby, 11), more than any other county in Division One.

Season standings
Key: Pld = Played, W = Wins, T = Ties, L = Losses, NR = No result, Pts = Points, NRR = Net run rate.

Notes:
Team marked  won the NatWest Pro40.

Match logs and statistics

Champions League Twenty20

By finishing as runners-up in the Twenty20 Cup, Somerset qualified to compete in the 2009 Champions League Twenty20, the first global club cricket tournament. Media attention surrounded Trescothick, who had returned home early from his last overseas tour in 2006–07 with a "stress-related illness". Brian Rose stressed that there was no pressure on Trescothick to take part in the tournament, and that the county would do everything possible to support him. The former England batsman did take part in the tournament, arriving three days after the rest of the squad. He played in both of Somerset's matches in the group stage of the competition, though he only managed to score 17 runs between his two innings.

Somerset won their first match, in which Alfonso Thomas scored two boundaries off the last three balls of the match to secure victory. Their opponents, Deccan Chargers scored 153 off their 20 overs, and with three wickets remaining, Somerset required 55 runs off 37 balls to win. A record eighth-wicket partnership between James Hildreth and Thomas of 50 brought the victory within reach, and Thomas' highest-score in Twenty20 cricket granted Somerset the win. Somerset lost their second match, being bowled out for their second-lowest Twenty20 total, 106 by Trinidad and Tobago.

Somerset progressed to the second round of the competition after Trinidad and Tobago beat Deccan in the final group match, but lost Trescothick, who flew home after a recurrence of his illness. Wes Durston, who replaced Trescothick in the side, top-scored for Somerset in their next match, making 57. Only two other players reached double-figures for the county, and the Diamond Eagles chased down the total with eight balls to spare. Somerset went into their final match, against the New South Wales Blues with a slim mathematical chance of progressing, but a strong bowling display from Brett Lee and Stuart Clark restricted Somerset to 111, which the Australian side reached with ease.

Season standings
Key: Pld = Played, W = Wins, L = Losses, T = Ties, NR = No result, Pts = Points, NRR = Net run rate.

Notes:
Teams marked  progressed to the next stage of the competition.
Teams marked  were eliminated from the competition.

Notes:
Teams marked  progressed to the next stage of the competition.
Teams marked  were eliminated from the competition.

Match logs and statistics

Reaction

After the conclusion of the Champions League tournament, Justin Langer retired from professional cricket. Trescothick replaced him as Somerset captain for the 2010 season. Somerset also lost Andrew Caddick to retirement. Wicket-keeper Carl Gazzard also announced his retirement at the end of the season aged 27, having lost his place in the Somerset side to Craig Kieswetter. Additionally, Somerset released Wes Durston and Omari Banks, both of whom they felt were surplus to requirements. Somerset addressed the weakness of their spin bowling by signing Murali Kartik as their overseas player for 2010.

Kieswetter's performances in the 2009 season led to his inclusion in the England Performance Programme squad in November and December of that year, and he was part of the England Lions squad which toured the United Arab Emirates in early 2010, along with Somerset team-mate Peter Trego. His full England debut came shortly after in Bangladesh. Additionally, two of Somerset's young players, Jos Buttler and Calum Haggett played for England Under-19s during the English winter.

Financially, Somerset broke even in 2009, generating a gross turnover of £4.5 million. The club achieved this despite carrying out significant building work on the County Ground during the period: the "Somerset Stand", a 3,000-seat grandstand opened in April, while the "Andy Caddick Pavilion" was completed just over a month later, providing new dressing rooms and club offices. Andy Nash, the Somerset chairman, highlighted the catering department and match-day income as being particularly successful in 2009, with both areas exceeding £1 million in revenue during the year.

Notes and references

Notes

References

2009 in English cricket
Somerset County Cricket Club seasons